Rear Admiral Julian Francis Chichester Patterson OBE (1884–1972) was a senior Royal Navy officer.

Naval career
Born on 6 May 1884, Julian Patterson was educated at Bedford School and at Britannia Royal Naval College. He received his first commission in the Royal Navy in 1904 and served in the Royal Navy during the First World War, serving at the Battle of Jutland in 1916. Between April 1931 and August 1932 he commanded HMS Hood, flagship of the Royal Navy's Battle Cruiser Squadron.

Rear Admiral Julian Patterson retired from the Royal Navy in 1933. He died on 23 June 1972.

References

1884 births
1972 deaths
People educated at Bedford School
Royal Navy rear admirals
Royal Navy personnel of World War I
Officers of the Order of the British Empire